The CONCACAF Gold Cup is North America's major tournament in senior men's football and determines the continental champion. Until 1989, the tournament was known as CONCACAF Championship. It is currently held every two years. From 1996 to 2005, nations from other confederations have regularly joined the tournament as invitees. In earlier editions, the continental championship was held in different countries, but since the inception of the Gold Cup in 1991, the United States are constant hosts or co-hosts.

From 1973 to 1989, the tournament doubled as the confederation's World Cup qualification. CONCACAF's representative team at the FIFA Confederations Cup was decided by a play-off between the winners of the last two tournament editions in 2015 via the CONCACAF Cup, but was then discontinued along with the Confederations Cup.

Since the inaugural tournament in 1963, the Gold Cup was held 26 times and has been won by seven different nations, most often by Mexico (11 titles).

Cuba have participated in the continental championship eleven times, but only won five out of their 34 matches, never more than one at a single tournament. Their best position was a Fourth Place in 1971. They rank 14th in the tournament's All-time table, but have the worst goal difference out of all 29 teams (−92).

Record at the CONCACAF Championship/Gold Cup

Match Overview

Record by Opponent

Defections to the United States

The Gold Cups on US-American soil allowed the Cuban players to get visas for the duration of the tournament. The wet feet, dry feet policy established in 1995 essentially allowed Cuban refugees in the United States to qualify for permanent resident status. The policy and the dream of making a career as a professional footballer, at a much higher level than the Cuban top division made a defection to the United States an attractive option, which some of them took. Until the policy's cessation in 2017, the following Cuban internationals defected during the tournament:

Rey Ángel Martínez and Alberto Delgado in 2002.
Maykel Galindo in 2005.
Osvaldo Alonso and Lester Moré in 2007.
Yosniel Mesa in 2011.
Keyler García, Arael Argüellez, Darío Suárez and Ariel Martínez in 2015.

References

Gold Cup
Cuba national football team